Carl Christian Hall (13 August 1848 – 6 May 1908) was a Danish mountaineering pioneer.

He was born in Frederiksberg as a son of Prime Minister Carl Christian Hall. He made 46 first ascents of Norwegian mountains. He was decorated Knight of the Order of St. Olav in 1890.

References

1848 births
1908 deaths
People from Frederiksberg
Danish mountain climbers